Innogy SE was an energy company based in Essen, Germany. It is now merged and integrated into German energy company E.ON.

History
The company was created on 1 April 2016, by splitting the renewable, network and retail businesses of RWE into a separate entity. The new entity combined RWE subsidiaries RWE Innogy, RWE Deutschland, RWE Effizienz, RWE Vertrieb and RWE Energiedienstleistungen.

On 7 October 2016, it was listed at the Frankfurt Stock Exchange. They served 23 million customers in Europe. In November 2017, it was announced that Innogy was looking to merge its energy retail subsidiary npower in the United Kingdom, with the equivalent division of rival SSE. 

It was planned that Innogy shareholders would own 34% of the demerged entity, however, the deal fell through, and in November 2019, it was announced that npower would ultimately be wound down following the acquisition of Innogy by E.ON.

In March 2018, it was announced that E.ON would acquire Innogy, in a complex deal of assets swap with RWE. The transfer of shares was completed in September 2019.

eMobility
In December 2016, Innogy combined its electric vehicles related activities into a new subsidiary called innogy eMobility Solutions GmbH. It operates one of the largest charging points network in Europe, which includes 7,000 charging points in over twenty countries. Since September 2008, it operated in cooperation with Daimler AG test project in Berlin called e-mobility Berlin. It also cooperated with an Italian company called Be Charge. 

In July 2018, the subsidiary of the United States, innogy eMobility US, announced the acquisition of California based BTCPower, a manufacturer of DC fast chargers and AC Level 2 chargers.
In October 2018, the acquisition of California based  
Recargo, an electric mobility software company, was announced. Recargo produces the popular PlugShare platform that helps electric vehicle (EV) drivers find public charging stations.

References

RWE
Companies based in Essen
Companies listed on the Frankfurt Stock Exchange
Electric power companies of Germany
Renewable energy companies of Germany
German companies established in 2016
Renewable resource companies established in 2016
2019 mergers and acquisitions
Defunct energy companies of Germany
E.ON